Il conquistatore di Corinto (AKA: The Centurion) is a French/Italian international co-production 1961 historical drama film set in 146 BC in Greece.  Against the backdrop of the Battle of Corinth, this movie is centered on a love story between a Roman centurion named Caius Vinicius and Hebe, the daughter of a local governor with anti-Roman sentiments.

This film was directed by Mario Costa.

Cast
Jacques Sernas as Caius Vinicius 
John Drew Barrymore as  Diaeus 
Geneviève Grad as Hebe 
Gianna Maria Canale as Artemide 
Gordon Mitchell as Quintus Caecilius Metellus Macedonicus 
Gianni Santuccio as Critolaus 
Ivano Staccioli as Hippolytus 
Nando Tamberlani as  Callicrates
Gianni Solaro as Ambassadeur 
Andrea Fantasia as Lucius Quintus
José Jaspe as The Traitor
Franco Fantasia as Anteo 
Miranda Campa as Cinzia 
Dina De Santis as Chimene 
Adriano Micantoni as Kerone
Vassili Karis as Egeo
Adriana Vianello as Cleo 
Milena Vukotic as Servant of Artemide 
Ignazio Balsamo as Geôlier
Luciano Pigozzi as Messager from Corinthe
Nerio Bernardi as Wealthy Citizen of Corinth
Nino Marchetti as Citizen of Corinth

Reception 
The movie was criticized for significant historical inaccuracies and even called "pure peplum propaganda."

See also
List of historical films
List of films set in ancient Rome

References

External links
 

1961 films
1960s historical films
Peplum films
French historical drama films
Films set in ancient Rome
Films set in ancient Greece
Films set in the 2nd century BC
Sword and sandal films
Films directed by Mario Costa
1960s Italian films